The Jatari Indian Folk Association is a Hungarian musical group aims to explore and collect the folk traditions such as folk music, folk and sacral dances, national costume, folk instruments, legends, folk tales, Catholic liturgical and Gregorian tunes of Andean cultures of South America. The outcomes of this collecting work are represented in the frame of lectures, photo and folk exhibitions and music and dance shows.

Name 
The meaning of the word jatari is ‘wake up’. It originates from Quichua language of Ecuador.

History 
The Jatari Indian Folk Group was formed on 2 October 1992, in Mezőkövesd, Hungary with 18 members. Its founder was László Koncz who firstly took part in a Hungarian folk dance group but afterward he turn to Indian culture. In 1993 the Jatari Indian Folk Group was introduced to the whole country by participating in Ki mit tud?, a talent show broadcast on the Hungarian Television.

In 1994 the Jatari Indian Folk Group became Jatari Indian Folk Association that aimed Hungarian (and other) people familiarise with the Indian folk culture and this based on authentic sources. This work was advocated by consulates of South American countries, Indians, who originates from Andes but living in Hungary, photographers, archaeologists, anthropologists and folk musicians. As appreciation of his work, László Koncz was given the nickname ‘Mamani’ what means ‘hawk’ by local Indians in Andes.

Fieldworks 

 1994 – In the Gate of Sun. Expedition to Ecuador.
 2000 – In the Gate of Sun 2. Expedition to Ecuador and Peru
 2001 – In the Gate of Sun 3. Expedition to Peru, to ‘Bearmen’
 2004 – In the Gate of Sun. Expedition to Bolivia and Peru
 2008 – Expedition to Ecuador

Albums of Jatari Indian Folk Group 

 Ayarachis CD (2006)
 Ayarachis DVD (2006)

Exhibitions, lectures, show

International Folk Dance Festivals 

 1993 – Mezőkövesd
 1993 – Eger: Jatari-Los Andinos
 1993 – ‘Gold Shall’ Festival – Siófok
 1994 – Mezőkövesd
 1995 – Mezőkövesd
 1996 – ‘Gold Shall’ Festival – Siófok
 1996 – Mezőkövesd
 1997 – Mezőkövesd
 1998 – Mezőkövesd
 1999 – Győr
 1999 – Mezőkövesd
 1999 – Mohács
 2000 – Mezőkövesd
 2001 – Mezőkövesd
 2002 – Mezőkövesd
 2003 – Mezőkövesd
 2004 – Mezőkövesd

Exhibitions 

 1995 – ‘In the Gate of Sun’ – photo and ethnographic exhibition and folk dance show in the Ethnographical Museum, Budapest
 1996 – country-cross series of ‘In the Gate of Sun’ – photo and ethnographic exhibition
 1997 – Mexican photo and ethnographic exhibition – Kalocsa
 1999 – Los Gringos and Jatari common concert and exhibition – Kiskunhalas
 2000 – ‘In the Gate of Sun’ – photo and ethnographic exhibition
 2001 – ‘The Amazing Cordilleras’ – photo and ethnographic exhibition country tour
 2001 – ‘With Bearmen to the Mountain Gods’ – slide-projection – Eger
 2001 – ‘With Bearmen to the Mountain Gods’ – slide-projection – Miskolc
 2002 – ’10 Years from the Life of Jatari Indian Folk Art Group’ exhibition
 2002 – ‘The Amazing Cordilleras’ – photo and ethnographic exhibition – Eger
 2002 – ‘The Amazing Cordilleras’ – photo and ethnographic exhibition – Vámosgyörk
 2004 – ‘The Amazing Cordilleras’ – photo and ethnographic exhibition – Emőd
 2004 – ‘The Amazing Cordilleras’ – photo and ethnographic exhibition – Mezőkövesd
 2006 – Travelling exhibition – Miskolc
 2006 – Peruvian Pictured Chronicle’ exhibition – Mezőkövesd
 2007 – Inka exhibition in the Fine Arts Museum – Budapest
 2007 – ‘Ancient Cult in a Christian World’ – Peruvian photo exhibition in Mezőkövesd
 2008 – ‘Catholic Churches in the Andes’ photo exhibition – Mezőkövesd
 2008 – ‘Ecuador, the Land of Equinox’ – photo and ethnographic exhibition – Mezőkövesd
 20 July 2009 – opening the Andes Folk Gallery, what is the only South –American Gallery in Hungary  – 24. Szent László Square, Mezőkövesd

Tours 

 1993 – cross-country tour with Los Andinos Group
 1994 – cross-country tour with Los Gringos Group
 1995 – cross-country tour with Los Gringos Group
 1995 – tour in the environs of Keszthely
 2003 – ‘In the Gate of Sun’ cross-country tour of Jatari

Concerts 

 1995 – Nationality folk festival – Pomáz – Los Gringos – Jatari group
 1996 – Nationality folk festival – Mezőkövesd – Los Gringos – Jatari group
 1996 – Los Gringos and Jatari group's common concert
 1997 – Los Gringos and Jatari's show in Budai House of Music – Fonó
 1998 – Jatari – Pescador de Perlas Show on Women's Day – Mezőkövesd
 1998 – Jatari's performance for the School of Blind and Low Vision Persons – Debrecen
 2005 – ‘Midsummer Night's Concert’ – Szombathely
 2006 – Ayarachis record introducing concert
 2006 – XXVII. International Vintage Celebration – Kiskunhalas

Television Shows 

 1993 – Jatari group's participation on a talent competition broadcast, called ‘Ki mit tud’
 1994 – South-American ZOO Park's opening in Szeged, Jatari-Los Gringos’ live show on MTV's ‘Szieszta’
 1996 – Jatari group's participation on a talent competition broadcast, called ‘Ki mit tud’
 1997 – National Latin American dance festival – Kiskunhalas – Jatari
 2000 – MTV,  ‘Téma’, a film about the leader of Jatari
 2001 – RTL, ‘Fókusz’, a report film on Koncz László and Kurdi Zoltán
 2008 – MTV, ‘Főtér’
 2008 – Fiesta de San Pedro – travelogue film of Koncz László in Ecuador

Prices 

 1997 – Special Fee of International Folk Dance Festival in Poland, Zory
 2008 – Local Government of Mezőkövesd gave to László Koncz, the founder and leader of Jatari Indian Folk Association the title of ‘The Man of Year’.

Authentic instruments 

 from Ecuador: palla, rondador, pututus, bocina wind instruments
 from Peru: maolin, mandolin, charango bow instruments, chulis, Malta, sanka panpipes
 from Bolivia: jula-jula ritual war  and toyos panpipes, charango instrument family, drums, bells

External links 
 Andok galéria
 Jatari

Hungarian folk music groups
Andean music